Daniel Stewart may refer to:

Politicians
 Dan Stewart (politician) (born 1963), American politician
 Daniel Stewart (politician) (born 1962), first openly gay elected mayor in New York State history

Others
 Daniel Stewart (Australian footballer) (born 1988), Australian rules footballer
 Daniel Stewart (Brigadier General) (1761–1829), joined the Georgia Militia in 1776
 Daniël Stewart, co-composed Tiesto's "UR/A Tear in the Open"
 Dan Stewart (As the World Turns) (1958–1979), a fictional character on the soap opera As the World Turns
 Daniel Stewart's College
 Daniel Stewart (born 1967), English actor, son of actor Patrick Stewart
 I. Daniel Stewart (1933–2005), Utah judge
 Daniel David Stewart, American singer and television and theatre actor

See also
 
 
 Daniel Stuart (1766–1846), Scottish journalist